The Divine Move 2: The Wrathful is a 2019 South Korean crime action film directed by Lee Khan. A prequel spin-off to the 2014 film The Divine Move, it stars Kwon Sang-woo, Kim Hee-won, and Kim Sung-kyun. The film premiered in South Korean cinemas on November 7, 2019.

Synopsis
Gwi-soo (Kwon Sang-woo) loses everything due to the game of baduk. With the help of his baduk teacher Heo Il-do (Kim Sung-kyun) and Teacher Ddong (Kim Hee-won), Gwi-soo jumps into the high stakes baduk game. He goes up against masters from all over the country.

Cast

 Kwon Sang-woo as Gwi-soo
 Park Sang-hoon as young Gwi-soo
 Kim Hee-won as Teacher Ddong
 Kim Sung-kyun as Heo Il-do
 Heo Sung-tae as "Busan Weed"
 Woo Do-hwan as "Loner" 
 Stephanie Lee as Hwang Sun-hee
 Jung In-gyeom as Hwang Duk-young
 Won Hyun-joon as Shaman Jansung
 Shin Soo-yeon as Soo-yeon
 Kim Jung-pal as Son-hyung
 Go Se-won as Priest (cameo)
 Yoo Sun as Madam Hong (cameo)
 Park Kyung-hye as train station clerk (cameo)
 Lee Byung-joon (cameo)

Production
Filming began on September 15, 2018 and was wrapped up on January 14, 2019.

Reception

Critical response
The film received generally positive reviews from critics.

Yoon Min-sik from The Korea Herald wrote, "One-dimensional characters, comic-bookish exaggeration, numerous plot holes and no real twist -- yet the film still manages to be quite fun with adrenaline-pumping action and excitement. It’s not a masterpiece, but it manages to create an intriguing, messed-up world."

Box office
On its opening day, the film finished first place at the box office by attracting 176,604 moviegoers, ahead of Terminator: Dark Fate and Kim Ji-young: Born 1982. During its opening weekend, the film topped box office with US$6.74 million gross from 879,000 admissions. The film surpassed 2 million  admissions on November 22.

As of June 20, 2022, the film attracted 2,159,081 admissions with US$14.3 million gross.

References

External links
 
 
 
 
 

2019 films
2010s Korean-language films
South Korean action films
South Korean crime films
South Korean crime action films
South Korean martial arts films
2019 action films
2019 crime action films
2019 martial arts films
Prequel films
Go films
Films about board games
CJ Entertainment films
South Korean prequel films
2010s South Korean films